Televise is the third album from New York-based Calla.

Track listing

 "Strangler" – 4:24
 "Monument" – 3:40
 "Astral" – 4:35
 "Don't Hold Your Breath" – 4:48
 "Pete the Killer" – 3:30
 "Customized" – 4:56
 "As Quick as It Comes/Carrera" – 6:23
 "Alacran" – 1:13
 "Televised" – 6:22
 "Surface Scratch" – 6:13

References

External links
Arena Rock Recording Co.

2003 albums
Calla (band) albums
Arena Rock Recording Company albums